Brian Murphy was the acting United States Under Secretary of Homeland Security for Intelligence and Analysis from March 2018 until July 31, 2020.

Career 
He earned a Bachelor of Arts in Government from the College of William & Mary, and a Master’s degree in Islamic studies from Columbia University. He is currently a doctoral student at Georgetown University.  He served in the U.S. Marine Corps from 1994 to 1998 as an infantry officer. Murphy began his FBI career in 1998 and worked there for 20 years, culminating in a position responsible for the FBI’s national level counterterrorism programs.  As a junior special agent assigned to the FBI's New York Field Office his work in counterterrorism were noted in an Esquire article called Brian Murphy V. The Bad Guys Murphy was also a leading counterterrorism investigator who focused on illicit financing.  He led an FBI investigation called Blackbear.  The Blackbear illicit counterterrorism case was among the first of its kind in the post 9-11 environment.

Murphy took a leave of absence from the FBI and was called back to active duty as a Marine Officer. As an infantry officer, Murphy served with a Marine reserve infantry battalion 2/24 in Iraq in 2004.  He later moved to DHS as the Principal Deputy for Intelligence and Analysis, and in May 2020 became Acting Under Secretary for the Office of Intelligence and Analysis. He was temporarily reassigned from that position two months later after it was alleged his office had compiled dossiers of public information about journalists who were reporting on the George Floyd protests.

Murphy has appeared as an expert witness on both international and domestic terrorism.

Whistleblower complaint 
Murphy filed a whistleblower complaint in September 2020 alleging episodes of misconduct by top DHS officials. Murphy asserted that DHS secretary Chad Wolf and his deputy Ken Cuccinelli instructed him “to modify intelligence assessments to ensure they matched up with the public comments by President Trump on the subject of ANTIFA and 'anarchist' groups” and to downplay the threat posed by white supremacists. Murphy stated he declined to comply. Murphy also claimed Wolf told him to "cease providing intelligence assessments on the threat of Russian interference in the US, and instead start reporting on interference activities by China and Iran.” Murphy said Wolf told him this directive came from White House national security advisor Robert O'Brien.

He had also submitted prior complaints. In early 2020, he had submitted six internal complaints to the Office of the Director of National Intelligence about the way the intelligence program was addressing Russian disinformation. He had also filed two Office of the Inspector General reports about “attempted censorship of intelligence analysis.”

Days before his September 2020 complaint, ABC News reported that DHS under Trump 2020 had withheld the July release of an intelligence bulletin to law enforcement that warned of Russian efforts to promote “allegations about the poor mental health” of Joe Biden. DHS chief of staff John Gountanis halted the release pending review by secretary Wolf. The bulletin stated that analysts had “high confidence” of the Russian efforts, which were similar to efforts by Trump and his campaign to depict Biden as mentally unfit. A DHS spokesperson said the bulletin was “delayed” because it did not meet the department’s standards. The bulletin had not been released as of the date of the ABC News report. Murphy asserted in his complaint that Wolf told him “the intelligence notification should be ‘held’ because it ‘made the President look bad.’” Murphy alleged that Kirstjen Nielsen had politicized DHS.

Much of what Murphy alleged in his complaint has been proven accurate by press accounts or reports issued by other government agencies. For example, Murphy claims about reporting on China and Iran over Russian interference was articulated in the March 2021 Office of Director of National Intelligence's Election 2020 Intelligence Community Assessment.

On Juneteenth 2020, the "BlueLeaks" hack revealed a lack of information about right wing groups and Russian interference in the United States.

Murphy also alleged the threat from right wing domestic extremists was substantial, but he received pressure not to reveal the results. On January 6, 2021 the Capitol was overrun by extremists who were part of a right wing mob. Many reporters noted Murphy's intelligence predictions and the January 6 incident.

In July, 2021 it was revealed the DHS Inspector General's Office had interfered in the investigation into Murphy's claims.  And independent watch dog, the Project On Government Oversight, revealed in a seven page report that the DHS Inspector General, Joseph V. Cuffari, manipulated the investigation in an effort to disrupt the investigation into Murphy's claims.  The report states Murphy was cleared in January 2021 of any wrong doing by the rank and file IG staff, however, the Inspector General blocked the release of the conclusions.  The report and a NY Times article further explain the improper interference was conducted for political purposes.  The Inspector General and other senior staff at the IG's office attempted to protect Wolf and Cuccinelli from being investigated.  The article indicates the whistleblower allegations related to Russia and White Supremacy were among the causes for the improper intervention.  Both articles state if Murphy had not been wrongfully removed in September 2020 there is evidence DHS would have been in a position to detect the insurrection at the U.S. Capitol on January 6, 2021.

According to the Wall Street Journal, Murphy had asked for substantial resource enhancements in 2019 and early 2020 to combat a growing disinformation threat from Russia and an emerging White Supremacy threat.  His requests were denied by Wolf and Cuccinelli. In August 2021 it was reported by the press that once Murphy was removed in July 2020 he was replaced by an inexperienced partisan employee, Joseph Maher.  Maher shut-down all of the organizations ability to detect domestic terrorism threats.  The reports suggest this led to the intelligence failures at DHS to identify violent online rhetoric in the lead up to the January 6th, 2021 attack on the U.S. Capitol. Maher was reported by the New York Times to have potentially retaliated against Murphy after Murphy filed his Whistleblower complaint.  According to a DHS intelligence document produced under the Freedom of Information Act, shortly after Wolf removed Murphy, Maher restricted the ability of DHS to collect pertinent intelligence about Russian interference and White Supremacy.

References

External links
 

College of William & Mary alumni
Columbia Graduate School of Arts and Sciences alumni
United States Marines
Federal Bureau of Investigation agents
Year of birth missing (living people)
Living people